The women's 200 metre backstroke event at the 2010 Asian Games took place on 14 November 2010 at Guangzhou Aoti Aquatics Centre.

There were 14 competitors from 10 countries who took part in this event. Two heats were held, the heat in which a swimmer competed did not formally matter for advancement, as the swimmers with the top eight times from the both field qualified for the finals.

Zhao Jing from China won the gold medal, two Japanese swimmers Shiho Sakai and Aya Terakawa won the silver and bronze medal respectively.

Schedule
All times are China Standard Time (UTC+08:00)

Records

Results

Heats

Final

References

 16th Asian Games Results

External links 
 Women's 200m Backstroke Heats Official Website
 Women's 200m Backstroke Ev.No.10 Final Official Website

Swimming at the 2010 Asian Games